Robuloidacea is a superfamily included in the Protista order Lagenida in which the test wall is either not secondarily lamellar or is only slightly so, as in later taxa.

The robuloidacea superfamily was named by Frederick Reiss in 1963. It ranges stratigraphically from the Upper Silurian to the end of the Lower Cretaceous (Albian). Four families are recognized. They are the Middle Permian Robuloididae, Lower to Upper Permian Partisaniidae, Lower Permian to Lower Cretaceous Ichthyolariidae and the Upper Silurian to Upper Permian Syzraniidae.  Some of the genera included in the Robuloidacea were previously included in the Fusulinida (Parathuramminacea and Endothyracea) while others were found in the Nodosariidae, Nodosariacea.

References

 
 Loeblich & Tappan, 1988. Foraminiferal genera and their classification.

Foraminifera superfamilies